The Peștera is a right tributary of the Danube in Romania. It flows into the Danube in Cochirleni.

References

Rivers of Romania
Rivers of Constanța County